Nantymoel Rugby Football Club is a Welsh rugby union club based near Bridgend, Wales. The club is a member of the Welsh Rugby Union and is also a feeder club for the Ospreys.

A team was first believed to have established in Nantymoel during the 1885/86 season, but then known as the White Stars.

References 

Welsh rugby union teams